This is a list of the National Register of Historic Places listings in Grimes County, Texas.

This is intended to be a complete list of properties and districts listed on the National Register of Historic Places in Grimes County, Texas. There are two districts and four individual properties listed on the National Register in the county. Three individually listed properties are Recorded Texas Historic Landmarks. Both districts contain several more Recorded Texas Historic Landmarks with one district also holding a State Historic Site and two State Antiquities Landmarks.

Current listings

The publicly disclosed locations of National Register properties and districts may be seen in a mapping service provided.

|--
|}

See also

National Register of Historic Places listings in Texas
List of Texas State Historic Sites
Recorded Texas Historic Landmarks in Grimes County

References

External links

Grimes County, Texas
Grimes County
Buildings and structures in Grimes County, Texas